Ronald J. Norick (born August 5, 1941) is an American politician. A Republican, he served as mayor of Oklahoma City, Oklahoma from 1988 to 1998. He is the son of James H. Norick, who served as Mayor of Oklahoma City from 1959 to 1963 and 1967 to 1971. He attended Oklahoma City University and studied management. He is a former bank director and manager of Norick Investments Company LLC. He was inducted into the Oklahoma Hall of Fame in 2008.

He was the mayor of Oklahoma City when the 1995 bombing of the Alfred P. Murrah Federal Building occurred.

He opened a local hardware store in the Quail Creek area of North OKC in 2018, with his son Lance Norick

See also
 Metropolitan Area Projects
 Ronald J. Norick Downtown Library

References

External links
 
Voices of Oklahoma interview with Ron Norick. First person interview conducted on July 28, 2009, with Ron Norick.

1941 births
Living people
Mayors of Oklahoma City
Oklahoma City University alumni
Oklahoma Republicans